Roddy Lorimer (born 19 May 1953) is a Scottish musician who plays trumpet and flugelhorn. He has performed with a wide array of artists, including Blur, Gene, the Rolling Stones, Draco Rosa, the Who, the Style Council, Eric Clapton, Suede, Supergrass, Beyoncé, Jamiroquai, Dr John, the Waterboys, Nik Kershaw, Bruce Foxton, Fish (of Marillion). He is a founding member of the horn section Kick Horns.

Career
Lorimer studied the trumpet at the Royal Scottish Academy of Music and Drama in Glasgow. His classical music background can be heard quite distinctively in his work for the Waterboys' single "The Whole of the Moon", which later turned out to be the band's greatest commercial success. Lorimer includes another Waterboys recording, an arrangement of W. B. Yeats' poem "The Stolen Child", amongst his top ten favourite recordings of all time.

Lorimer, as part of the Kick Horns, toured the North America and the UK with the Who in 1989. World tours with Eric Clapton in 1993–96 and later a European tour for six months with the Clapton Band in 2006. He was a member of Pete Townshend's 'Deep End' (1985), a short-lived supergroup founded by Townshend featuring Pink Floyd guitarist David Gilmour. The group also included drummer Simon Phillips, bassist Chucho Merchan, percussionist Jody Linscott, keyboardist John 'Rabbit' Bundrick, harmonica player Peter Hope Evans, vocalists Billy Nicholls, Cleveland Watkiss, and Chyna.

He toured extensively through the 1980s and early 1990s with the Waterboys. Currently he is playing with Cotton Mouth, one of Bangkok, Thailand's best blues rock bands, and Rolling Stones tribute band Midnight Ramblers, also based in Bangkok.

Select discography

Baaba Maal - Firin’ in Fouta, Nomad soul
The Beautiful South - Perfect 10, Good as gold, Quench
Beyonce – Green light
Eric Bibb - Natural Light
Blur - Parklife, Country house, The great escape, Modern life is rubbish, Popscene
Boyzone – Picture of you
China Crisis -Working with fire and steel, Flaunt the imperfection
Erasure – The Innocents
Eric Clapton - From the cradle, Back Home
Deep Purple - Live at the Royal Albert Hall (2000)
Dodgy - Good enough, Making the most of, Free peace sweet
Dr John - Anutha zone (Sweet home New Orleans, Party hellfire, Voices in my head, Look out)
Gabrielle - Give me a little more time
David Gilmour – About face
David Gray - Life in Slow Motion
Groove Armada - Vertigo (Pre 63/)
Geri Halliwell - Look at me, Bag it up, Schizophonic
Iron Maiden - Elected
Jamiroquai - Synkronized
Tom Jones - Reload, Carrying a torch
The Lightning Seeds - Sense
Michael McDonald - SoulSpeak
The Pretenders - Human on the inside
Primal Scream - Screamadelica, Dixie-narco e.p.
Finley Quaye - Sunday shining, Maverick a strike, Vanguard
Chris Rea - Auberge
The Rolling Stones - Steel wheels, Flashpoint
S Club 7 - Reach, Everybody wants you, Lately
Jimmy Somerville - Read my lips, Mighty real, Hurts so good, Too much of a good thing, Step inside
The Spice Girls - Stop, Too much
Spiritualized - Ladies and gentlemen we are floating in space, Electric mainline, Lazer guided melodies, Feel so sad
Stereo MCs - Connected, Deep down & dirty
Rod Stewart - A spanner in the works
Supergrass - Going out
James Taylor Quartet - Theme from Starsky and Hutch
Toploader - Onka’s big moka
Pete Townshend - White city, Face the face, Deep End live, Psychoderelict
The Waterboys - A pagan Place, This is the Sea, Fisherman's Blues, Room to Roam, Book of Lightning (The Whole of the Moon.)
Westernhagen - Jaja, Krieg, Affentheater, Keine Zeit
Wham - Fantastic ( Club Tropicana)
The Who - Join Together

Others by country
Germany – Die Fantastischen Vier, Udo Lindenberg, Nina Hagen, Extrabreit. Klaus Hoffmann
France – Lio, John Jaques Goldman, Ettiene Daho, Carmel
Spain - Danza Invisible
Scotland - Nazareth, Fish, The Proclaimers, Danny Wilson, John Martyn.
Ireland - The Pogues (without Shane MacGowan), Shane MacGowan (without the Pogues)
Wales - Cerys Matthews
England – The Levellers, Pele, The Pale Fountains, Bernie Marsden, Andy Fairweather Low, Bros, Dead or alive, Mel C, Lighthouse Family, Hard-fi, Public Image Limited, Duran Duran, Kim Wilde, Bruce Foxton, Richard Ashcroft, The Style Council, Holly Johnson, The Communards, Mr Blobby 
Scandinavia – Ah Ha, Ace of Base.
Australia – Kylie Minogue, The Sunny boys
Brazil – Robi Draco Rosa
Japan – Nobohide Sake, Miss Honda
Africa – Papa Wemba, Miryam Mursall
America – Rufus Wainwright, Michael McDonald, Jay Owens, Ben Taylor

References

External links
 

1953 births
Living people
Musicians from Glasgow
The Waterboys members
Scottish rock trumpeters
Alumni of the Royal Conservatoire of Scotland
Male trumpeters